Brian Lewis (26 January 1943 – 14 December 1998) was an English footballer, most noted as a player for Portsmouth, Luton Town and Colchester United.

Career
Lewis started out with Crystal Palace, but after only three years as a professional he moved to the club he supported, Portsmouth. After four years with Portsmouth, he moved on to first Coventry City, in 1967, and then Luton Town, in 1968. In 1970, he signed for Oxford United, but within the year he was on the move again, joining Colchester United. While at Colchester he took part in one of the great FA Cup giant-killings, when Fourth Division Colchester took on Leeds United in the fifth round in 1970–71. Leeds were one of the best teams in the country, and the tie seemed decided before a ball was kicked – but Colchester's team of veterans managed to beat Leeds 3–2. In 1972, he returned to Portsmouth, where he finished his professional career in 1975, when he moved on to Hastings United.

Honours

Club
Crystal Palace
 Football League Fourth Division Runner-up (1): 1960–61

Coventry City
 Football League Second Division Winner (1): 1966–67

Colchester United
 Watney Cup Winner (1): 1972

References

1943 births
1998 deaths
Sportspeople from Woking
English footballers
English Football League players
Crystal Palace F.C. players
Portsmouth F.C. players
Coventry City F.C. players
Luton Town F.C. players
Oxford United F.C. players
Colchester United F.C. players
Hastings United F.C. (1948) players
Association football midfielders